Nino Katamadze (born 21 August 1972) is a Georgian jazz singer and artist.

Biography
Nino Katamadze was born in Kobuleti, Adjara, Soviet Georgia in 1972. In 1990, she entered the vocal department of the Batumi Music Institute ZP Paliashvili. After finishing the Institute was in various groups and participated in a variety of musical projects. In 2002, Katamadze had her first international tour in different countries across Europe.

In 2006, her album "White" became very successful and was released in Georgia, Russia, Finland, Sweden, Ukraine, France, Germany, Italy and the UK. Sales exceeded 700,000 copies. In January 2010, she played a part in an improvised opera "Bobble" with a wordless libretto written by Bobby McFerrin and staged in Russia.

Discography

Albums
 Ordinary Day
 Nino Katamadze & Insight
 Start new peaceful day (Live DVD)
 White (2006)
 Black (2006)
 Blue (2008)
 Red (2010)
 Green (2011)
 Yellow (2016)

Soundtracks
 Mermaid (film, 2008)
 Heat (2006 film)
 Apple
 Orange Sky
 Road to the Savior
 Indi (2007)
 The Ghost (film, 2008)

References

External links
 Official Site - Nino Katamadze
 LiveJournal - Nino Katamadze

1972 births
Living people
21st-century women singers from Georgia (country)
People from Kobuleti
Women singer-songwriters
Jazz singers from Georgia (country)
Recipients of the Presidential Order of Excellence